Caiuby Francisco da Silva (born 14 July 1988), commonly known as Caiuby, is a Brazilian professional footballer who plays as a forward for Regionalliga Bayern club Türkgücü München.

Career
Caiuby was born in São Paulo. His former clubs include São Paulo FC, Corinthians and AD São Caetano.

On 29 August 2008, he joined VfL Wolfsburg from Brazilian club Guaratinguetá, signing a contract until 2013. On 20 July 2009, the 2. Bundesliga club MSV Duisburg signed the 21-year-old striker on loan from VfL Wolfsburg for one year. He played his first game in a friendly match against Club Brugge. After his loan ended, he returned to VfL Wolfsburg, but failed to establish himself. In January 2011, he was loaned out again, this time to FC Ingolstadt 04.

In February 2019, he joined Grasshopper Club Zürich on loan from FC Augsburg until the end of the season.

He returned to FC Ingolstadt 04 in January 2021. He left the club in June 2021.

During the 2022 winter transfer window, Caiuby joined Kavala, a Greek club who participates at the second tier of Greek Football, Super League Greece 2.

Caiuby returned to Germany on 19 August 2022, signing with recently relegated Regionalliga Bayern club Türkgücü München.

Honours
VfL Wolfsburg
 Bundesliga: 2008–09

References

External links
 
  
 

1988 births
Living people
Brazilian footballers
Association football forwards
Associação Ferroviária de Esportes players
São Paulo FC players
Sport Club Corinthians Paulista players
Associação Desportiva São Caetano players
VfL Wolfsburg players
MSV Duisburg players
FC Ingolstadt 04 players
FC Augsburg players
Grasshopper Club Zürich players
Kavala F.C. players
Türkgücü München players
Bundesliga players
2. Bundesliga players
Swiss Super League players
Super League Greece 2 players
Regionalliga players
Brazilian expatriate footballers
Brazilian expatriate sportspeople in Germany
Brazilian expatriate sportspeople in Switzerland
Brazilian expatriate sportspeople in Greece
Expatriate footballers in Germany
Expatriate footballers in Switzerland
Expatriate footballers in Greece
Footballers from São Paulo